Blind Date is a British dating game show first produced by London Weekend Television. An unscreened pilot was made with comic Duncan Norvelle as presenter but it was eventually hosted by Cilla Black, who already hosted the LWT series Surprise Surprise. Blind Date originally ran on Saturday nights from 30 November 1985 to 31 May 2003 on ITV.

The show returned in 2017 on Channel 5. The new series began airing on 17 June 2017 in its usual Saturday night slot and is produced by So Television, Olga TV and Stellify Media, a firm part-owned by Sony Pictures Television. Paul O'Grady presented the revived series. Melanie Sykes became the new voice of the show, taking over the role most famously held by Graham Skidmore in the original series.

Format
The show had a format similar to the show known in Australia as Perfect Match or in the US as The Dating Game. Three singles of the same sex were introduced to the audience. They were then asked a question by a single individual of the opposite sex, who could hear but not see them, to choose with whom to go on a date. Before the decision Our Graham (replaced in the final ITV series by Tommy Sandhu), who was never seen, gave an amusing reminder of each contestant. The couple then picked an envelope naming their destination. The following episode showed the couple on their date, as well as interviews with them about the date and each other. Locations ranged from Bognor Regis or a date in an ice cream factory, to Anguilla or the Maldives.

In the final original series (2002–03), the format was tweaked; the "Ditch or Date?" twist was added to the show. Also, a behind-the-scenes companion show, called Blind Date: Kiss & Tell was produced for ITV2 and hosted by Sarah Cawood and Brendan Courtney.

In 2003, the show was broadcast live to try to improve dwindling ratings.

History

Production
A pilot, as It's a Hoot!, was shot in early 1985 and fronted by comedian Duncan Norvelle. John Birt, LWT's director of programmes, and the IBA regulatory body had reservations about Norvelle's camp style. Black had seen The Dating Game in the US and enthused about it to LWT's Alan Boyd, who produced Surprise, Surprise and who made the Norvelle pilot. After two pilots starring Black, the series was commissioned. Thelma Pickles, an old girlfriend of John Lennon, worked as a producer on the show. The distinctive theme music for Blind Date has a strong resemblance to the jazz standard "Soft Winds" and was composed by Laurie Holloway.

Popularity and decline
At the height of its popularity in the 1980s, 18.2 million tuned in on a Saturday night. Black's scouse accent and her catchphrases became familiar throughout the United Kingdom. The show won the Lew Grade Award at the British Academy Television Awards in 1995. The first episode of Series 17, on 10 November 2001, was reportedly watched at 19:00 GMT by seven million viewers – 32% of the audience. This was around a million fewer than tuned in to its debut episode in the previous series. This was likely to state that its popularity was on the wane. Black was responsible for ITV shifting its football programme, The Premiership, to make way for the new series in a prime-time slot. The broadcaster reportedly gave in to Black's ultimatum "move the Premiership football programme or I quit".

Viewing figures had declined to 5 million by 2003. The final episode in May 2003 was seen by 2.9 million viewers.

Cancellation
The series ended in 2003 when, during an episode on 4 January 2003 (the first to be broadcast live), Black announced she was quitting the show. The production crew had not been told. A change in the show's format was one of the factors in her decision to leave the show. Production was halted after the series ended; Trisha Goddard, Dale Winton and Paul O'Grady were to be in line for her replacement but the show was later cancelled. ITV had been refused permission to make changes to the format by Columbia, the US company which owned Blind Date at the time.

However, ITV briefly aired a similar replacement show in 2004 hosted by Davina McCall, called Love on a Saturday Night, and from 2010 to 2019, Take Me Out, hosted by Paddy McGuinness.

Brief return
Blind Date returned on 20 May 2006, as part of ITV's coverage of a concert held outside the Tower of London to celebrate the 30th anniversary of the foundation of the charity The Prince's Trust. Comedian Patrick Kielty and TV presenter Kate Thornton acted as hosts for the show which featured Dame Edna Everage, Roger Moore, Richard E. Grant and Chico Slimani as contestants.

It returned again on 16 October 2013 to celebrate Black's 50-year career in the entertainment industry. This special one-off was part of another programme, The One and Only Cilla Black, presented by Paul O'Grady. Black returned as host, and producers brought back three of the show's most memorable contestants who were still single, giving them a second chance to win a date. However, the couple's date was not shown.

Revival
A planned Irish revival of the format, hosted by Lucy Kennedy on TV3, was dropped by the broadcaster in June 2015. It was later picked up with comedian Al Porter announced as the host in May 2017.

In February 2017, it was announced that Blind Date would be returning but would now be aired on Channel 5 fourteen years after being cancelled. On 16 March 2017, Paul O'Grady was announced as the show's new presenter and Melanie Sykes provides the voiceover. The revived series began on 17 June 2017 and received mainly positive reviews. Unlike the original version, the revival features both mixed and same-sex couplings.

Celebrity contestants
Blind Date featured celebrities before they became well known. These include:
Mark Speight (1989)
Amanda Holden (1991)
Ed Byrne (1993)
Jenni Falconer (1994)
Ortis Deley (1995)
Nikki Grahame (2003)
A Comic Relief sketch in 1993 had Mr. Bean on the show. The sketch featured Rowan Atkinson as Bean, Barbara Durkin as Bean's date Tracy, and Cilla Black. The other contestants were played by Alan Cumming and Paul Opacic.
A 2002 celebrity Christmas edition featured Tara Palmer-Tomkinson and Alex Sibley

Weddings
During the show's history, three Blind Date weddings took place and were watched by millions of television viewers. Black was a guest at the weddings.

Sue Middleton & Alex Tatham (1991) – met on the show in 1988, married in October 1991 and celebrated 25 years together in 2013. They appeared as mystery guests on The Big Fat Quiz of Everything 2019.
Lillian Morris & David Fenson (1994) – they married in February 1994 in Tiverton, Devon.
Anna Azonwanna & Paul Pratt (1998) – met on the show in September 1993 and married in October 1998 in Barbados. The other couples also attended the wedding with Cilla.

On 29 December 2001, the episode saw contestant Hannarle Davies from Essex propose to Mark Ackerell from Buckinghamshire; after they fell in love on their date to Vienna, Austria. Davies later admitted that the proposal was a joke.

Minor controversy
A contestant named Nicola Gill came on the show, claiming she was a temporary secretary, when she was actually a journalist for Cosmopolitan. When Black found out about this, she exposed the truth about Gill's deception on the show, leading Gill to get booed by the audience, and her date to go away in total shock. Her date was later brought back on a different episode and offered a second chance, but as the one choosing from the three girls (as well as going on the holiday to Nepal by himself).

Episodes

Original

Series

Specials

Revival

Series

References

External links

Blind Date (UK) at BFI

1985 British television series debuts
2019 British television series endings
1980s British game shows
1990s British game shows
2000s British game shows
2010s British game shows
ITV game shows
Channel 5 (British TV channel) original programming
British dating and relationship reality television series
Cilla Black
English-language television shows
London Weekend Television shows
Television series by ITV Studios
Television series by Sony Pictures Television
British television series revived after cancellation